More Songs from Pooh Corner is the eleventh studio and second children's album by American singer-songwriter Kenny Loggins, released on February 8, 2000. Among the tracks are seven songs from movies, such as "Beauty and the Beast", "Baby Mine" (Dumbo), "Flying Dreams" (The Secret of NIMH), and "That'll Do" (Babe).

Track listing
"Your Heart Will Lead You Home" (from The Tigger Movie) (Kenny Loggins, Richard M. Sherman, Robert B. Sherman) - 5:13
"You'll Be in My Heart" (from Disney's Tarzan) (Phil Collins) - 5:19
"Always, In All Ways" (Mark Mancina, Loggins) - 4:07
"Flying Dreams" (Duet with Olivia Newton-John) (from The Secret of NIMH) (Paul Williams, Jerry Goldsmith) - 4:06
"That'll Do" (from Babe: Pig in the City) (Randy Newman) - 3:54
"Turn Around" (Malvina Reynolds, Harry Belafonte, Alan Greene) - 3:48
"Beauty and the Beast" (from Beauty and the Beast) (Alan Menken, Howard Ashman) - 3:42
"Baby Mine" (from Dumbo) (Churchill, Washington) - 4:27
The Inch Worm" (Duet with Isabella Loggins) (from Hans Christian Andersen) (Frank Loesser) - 3:28
"Hana Aluna Lullabye" (Barry Flanagan; English lyrics by Kenny and Julia Loggins) - 6:13
"Goodnight" (Duet with Alison Krauss) (John Lennon, Paul McCartney) - 3:35

Personnel
 Kenny Loggins – guitar, vocals
 Keli'i Kaneali'i – guitar, vocals
 Barry Flanagan – guitar, ukulele, vocals
 Dean Parks – guitar
 Jon Clarke – clarinet, English horn, oboe, recorder
 Eric Rigler – Uilleann pipes
 Jai Winding – keyboards
 Marc Mann – synthesizer
 Donn Wyatt – synthesizer
 Frank Marocco – accordion
 Norton Buffalo – harmonica
 Mark Mancina – bass guitar, guitar, Hammond organ
 Nathan East – bass guitar
 Larry Klein – bass
 Larry Tuttle – double bass
 Louis Molino – drums
 Peter Asher – drum programming
 Alison Krauss – vocals
 Kate McGarry – vocals
 Olivia Newton-John – vocals
 Karen Briggs – violin
 Joel Derouin – violin

References

2000 albums
Albums produced by Peter Asher
Children's music albums by American artists
Kenny Loggins albums